A movie is a work of visual art.

Movie, Movies, The Movie, or The Movies may also refer to:

Films 
 Feature film
 Film adaptation
 A Movie (1958), an experimental film
 Movies@, a cinema chain in the Republic of Ireland
 The Movie (film), a 2022 American comedy horror film
 The Movies (film), a 1925 silent film directed by Fatty Arbuckle

Music

Performers
 The Movies (band), a British band
 Tribes of the City, formerly The Movies, a Latvian post-rock band

Albums
 Movie (Mod Sun album), 2017
 Movies (Franco Ambrosetti album), 1987
 Movies (Holger Czukay album), 1979
 The Movies (Maks1im Mrvica album)
 The Movies (The Movies album)
 A Movie (Film By Kelly Chen), by Kelly Chen, 1997

Songs
 "Movies" (Alien Ant Farm song), 2001
 "Movies" (Circa Waves song)
 "The Movie", by Aerosmith from Permanent Vacation
 "The Movie", by the Doors from An American Prayer
 "Movie", by Megan Thee Stallion featuring Lil Durk from Good News

Television
 Movies!, an American digital multicast television network that broadcasts feature films
 "The Movie" (Seinfeld), a 1993 episode of Seinfeld
 The Movies (miniseries), a 2019 series on the history of American movies and their effects on American society
"The Movies" (The Goodies), a 1975 episode of The Goodies

Video games 
 Movie (video game), a 1986 computer game by Imagine Software
 The Movies, a 2005 simulation computer game

See also